Moravče is a village in Croatia.

References

Populated places in the City of Zagreb